Jacob Daniel Martin (born December 22, 1951) is an American actor.  He has been featured in numerous roles, primarily playing law enforcement characters or in movies about law enforcement, notably as Bradley Baker (a recurring police deputy chief) in The Bold and The Beautiful.

Filmography

Live-action 

 Rin Tin Tin: K-9 Cop (1988–1993, TV Series) as Lou Adams
 A Man Called Hawk (1989, TV Series) as Jackie Stubbs
 Casualties of War (1989) as Sergeant Hawthorne
 Doctor Doctor (1990, TV Series) as Dr. Martin Tomkins
 Tales from the Crypt (1991, TV Series) as 'Snaz'
 Roc (1991, TV Series) as George
 Jake and the Fatman (1992, TV Series) as Sergeant Lincoln 'Linc' Connell
 Sleepwalkers (1992) as Andy Simpson
 Dream On (1992, TV Series) as Barry
 L.A. Law (1993, TV Series) as Officer Walters
 Laurel Avenue (1993, TV Mini-Series) as Woodrow Arnett
 Hangin' with Mr. Cooper (1993, TV Series) as Vince
 Melrose Place (1994, TV Series) as Detective
 The Stand (1994, TV Mini-Series) as Rich Moffat
 Beverly Hills Cop III (1994) as Cooper
 The Wayans Bros. (1995, TV Series) as Cop #1
 Heat (1995) as Harry Dieter
 Campus Cops (1996, TV Series) as Announcer
 ER (1996, TV Series) as Lieutenant
 Nowhere Man (1996, TV Series) as Father Ray
 Pacific Blue (1996, TV Series) Lieutenant Douglas
 Friends (1996, TV Series) (uncredited)
 NYPD Blue (1996, TV Series) as Bouncer
 Fox Hunt (1996) as Croupier
 High Tide (1997, TV Series)
 Goode Behavior (1997, TV Series) as Lloyd
 The Pretender (1997, TV Series) as Dr. Fletcher
 Executive Target (1997) as Carter
 Nothing to Lose (1997) as L.A.P.D. Sergeant
 Profiler (1997, TV Series)
 The Practice (1997, TV Series) as Officer Tedesco
 The Good News (1997, TV Series) as Lieutenant Hecker
 The Bold and the Beautiful (1997–2018 and 2021–present, TV Series) as Bradley Baker
 Prey (1998, TV Series) as Prosecutor
 In the House (1998, TV Series) as Bentley Langford
 NightMan (1998, TV Series) as Minister
 Rush Hour (1998) as FBI Gate Guard #2
 Oh Baby (1998, TV Series) as Daniel
 NewsRadio (1998, TV Series) as Inspector Ron Jarek
 Clueless (1999, TV Series) as Referee
 Pensacola: Wings of Gold (1999, TV Series)
 Family Law (1999, TV Series) as Ed Adams
 Dawson's Creek (1999, TV Series) as Megan Whoopie
 Roswell (1999–2000, TV Series) as Principal
 Dancing in September (2000) as Tommy's Father
 18 Wheels of Justice (2000, TV Series) as Reverend Maurice Haybrook
 Get Real (2000, TV Series) as Coach Wilson
 The Invisible Man (2000, TV Series)
 Ally McBeal (2000, TV Series) as Principal Jollie
 That's Life
 Leprechaun in the Hood (2000) as Jackie D
 The Man Who Wasn't There (2001) as Bailiff
 Sacred Is the Flesh (2001)
 The Guardian (2001, TV Series) as Police Officer
 Grounded for Life (2001–2002, TV Series) Mr. Pennix
 JAG (2001–2004, TV Series) as Senior Chief
 Angel Blade (2002) as Lieutenant Paul Jackson
 Crocodile 2: Death Swamp (2002) as Pilot
 Enough (2002) as FBI Agent #1
 Groom Lake (2002) as Captain Morgan
 Presidio Med (2002, TV Series)
 Off Centre (2002, TV Series) as Dr. Mumford
 Robbery Homicide Division (2002, TV Series) as Joseph Vigna
 Malcolm in the Middle (2002–2006, TV Series) as Malik
 Everybody Loves Raymond (2003, TV Series) as Policeman
 The Handler (2003, TV Series)
 Judging Amy (2003–2004, TV Series) as Detective Avery / Detective 
 Three Way (2004) as Patrolman
 Clubhouse (2004, TV Series) as Security Guard #1
 Cold Case (2005, TV Series) as Maurice Banks
 View in Black & White (2005) as The Father
 CSI: Crime Scene Investigation (2005, TV Series) as Plant Nursery Worker
 Sleeper Cell (2005, TV Series) as Ernest Jefferson
 Gridiron Gang (2006) as Terrell Rollins
 Boston Legal (2006, TV Series) as Detective Russell Roberts
 Love... & Other 4 Letter Words (2007) as Lee Earl
 All of Us (2007, TV Series) as The Quizz Master
 Bones (2007, TV Series) as Major
 Burn Notice (2007, TV Series) as Dan Siebels
 The Nation (2009) as Bimbi
 Bob Funk (2009) as Mark
 Lie to Me (2009, TV Series) as Conrad Ricks
 Just Peck (2009) as Coach
 Numbers (2009–2010, TV Series) as Detective Jack Cates
 NCIS (2012, TV Series) as Mail Carrier
 Franklin & Bash (2012, TV Series) as Donald French
 10 Cent Pistol (2014) as Detective Dassin
 How to Get Away with Murder (2015, TV Series) as Janitor Joe
 First (2015, TV Series) as Walter
 The Grinder (2015, TV Series) as 'Murph' Murphy
 Code Black (2015, TV Series) as Donald
 Bachelors (2015) as Minister
 Criminal Minds (2016, TV Series) as Detective McLeary
 The Originals (2016–2018, TV Series) as Hollis
 School of Rock (2016, TV Series) as Gary
 Fresh Off the Boat (2017, TV Series) as Clyde Minter
 Famous in Love (2017, TV Series) as Dennis
 S.W.A.T. (2017, TV Series) as Dell
 Ten Days in the Valley (2017, TV Series) as Morgan
 Craig Ross Jr.'s Monogamy (2018) as Michael
 Nightmare Cinema (2018) as Dr. Michaelson
 Mom (2018, TV Series) as Juan
 Kidding (2018, TV Series) as Joe
 The Resident (2019, TV Series) as Floyd Washington
 9-1-1 (2019, TV Series) as Doctor
 Better Call Saul (2020, TV Series) as Judge Xavier Parson

External links 

1951 births
African-American male actors
American male film actors
Place of birth missing (living people)
American male soap opera actors
American male television actors
Living people
21st-century African-American people
20th-century African-American people